The 68th Massachusetts General Court, consisting of the Massachusetts Senate and the Massachusetts House of Representatives, met in 1847 during the governorship of George N. Briggs. William B. Calhoun served as president of the Senate and Ebenezer Bradbury served as speaker of the House.

Notable legislation included the anti-abortion "Act To Suppress Injurious Publications". Notable resolutions included opposition to the Mexican–American War.

Senators

Representatives

 William T. Andrews

See also
 30th United States Congress
 List of Massachusetts General Courts

References

Further reading
  (describes 1847-1891)

External links
 
 

Political history of Massachusetts
Massachusetts legislative sessions
massachusetts
1847 in Massachusetts